Hiba Michel Tawaji (born 10 December 1987) is a Lebanese singer, actress, and director. Since 2008, she established herself in the Lebanese and Arab music scene as a major artist recognized for her vocal skills. She has a 4-octave vocal range.

She started her career playing the main female role in well-known Rahbani musicals. She also participated in the fourth season of France's version of The Voice, in which she was coached by Mika and reached the semi-finals. After The Voice, she signed with Mercury Records in 2015. On 30 May 2016, it was announced that Tawaji will join the cast of Notre-Dame de Paris as Esmeralda in the revival of the musical. She has since toured with the cast and performed internationally. She has also pursued her Arabic career with four studio albums produced by Oussama Rahbani, and numerous projects on the Lebanese and Arab levels, including in Egypt, Tunisia and Saudi Arabia, where she was the first ever woman to sing on stage following an easing of restrictions on women's rights.

Tawaji is now signed to Universal Music Arabia, in partnership with Universal Music Group and Republic Records. She is currently recording her first album under the label, and has released the first single Que Será Será (Law Nebka Sawa) featuring the Despacito hitmaker Luis Fonsi.

Early life and education
Born in Achrafieh, Beirut to Lebanese Orthodox parents Adele and Michel, she grew up in Elissar, a neighborhood of Mazraat Yachouh in the Matn District. She learned music at a young age. She trained at an early age in opera and classical singing, then in modern style. From 1990 and until 2005, Tawaji studied at the Athenee de Beyrouth school and received a literary baccalaureate.

From 2002 until 2007, she took singing lessons and solfeggio at Ecole des Arts Ghassan Yammine. She then went to Saint Joseph University of Beirut, IESAV, and majored in audio-visual and cinematographic studies, earning her B.A. in 2010. Tawaji also trained in directing and acting. She obtained her bachelor's degree in 2012 with a short movie written and directed by her, titled The Rope. It won many prizes in film festivals across the Arab World (ZUMEFF, NDU Film Festival, Outbox Film Festival, etc.).

Career

2008–2014: Early career and musical debut

Singing in French, English, and Arabic, Tawaji was noticed by producers and composers in the Middle East. Fascinated by the genius of the Rahbani family, she sought to contact Oussama Rahbani who was impressed by her audition and immediately became her producer. Hiba has insisted on different occasions that her collaboration with Rahbani is lifelong, and that no actual contract exists to govern their projects together.

In 2008, Tawaji released her first single Metl El Rih (Like the Wind), which received extensive airtime on TV channels across Lebanon. She cemented her position as a promising newcomer on the musical scene with her acclaimed second single Helm (Dream), to which she directed the music video herself. Both songs were a product of her collaboration with the Rahbani family. In the meantime, Tawaji launched her stage career by debuting in 2008 as the protagonist in the musical The Return of the Phoenix by Mansour and Oussama Rahbani, played in Byblos and Dubai, alongside legends like Ghassan Saliba, Antoine Kerbage and Takla Chamoun. She also reprised the main role of musical Sayf 840, first played in 1987 by Fairuz's sister Hoda, the following year, also alongside Saliba.

Between May and July 2010, she took vocal lessons with Emmy Award winner Gwen Conley in New York. In that same period, she followed a three-month intensive acting workshop at the Stella Adler Studio of Acting in New York. She returned to Lebanon and appeared in other musicals by the Rahbanis, Don Quixote and Moulouk Al Tawaef.

In 2012, Tawaji released her first album La Bidayi Wala Nihayi, in collaboration with Oussama Rahbani. The eponymous single is an Arabic version of The Windmills of Your Mind (Les Moulins de mon Coeur) written by Michel Legrand, and received considerable airplay in Lebanon and the Arab world, propelling Tawaji to recognition from the public. The record also contained the songs Zat Ellafti, with pop influences, and La Tkelli Ennak Meshtakli which is reminiscent of Fairuz's music in her later jazzy era with her son Ziad. Hiba Tawaji's second album, Ya Habibi, was released in 2014 and was also positively received as it was carried by the singles Khalas and Awwal Ma Cheftou. The record also comprises Tawaji's version of the song Helwa ya baladi, first performed by Dalida.

Tawaji has also performed in 2013 and 2014 with the National Symphonic Orchestra of Ukraine, headlining shows in Lebanon, Oman and the United Arab Emirates. She also released in 2014 the official tribute song to the Lebanese Army on its 69th anniversary, Metl El Chajar Mazrouiin.

2015–2017: Appearance on The Voice and career in France
In January 2015, Tawaji took part in the fourth season of The Voice: la plus belle voix, France's version of The Voice. In the blind auditions, she auditioned with a bilingual version of La Bidayi Wala Nihayi, leading all four judges, Mika, Florent Pagny, Jenifer and Zazie, to turn their chairs. Tawaji opted to be in Team Mika. The blind audition was broadcast on day 3 of the auditions on 24 January 2015.

In the Battles Round, Tawaji faced Nög, another contestant in Mika's team, singing "Mon amie la rose" by Françoise Hardy. Mika elected to proceed to the next round with Tawaji, while Nög was stolen by fellow coach Zazie. During the "L'Épreuve ultime" round, she performed "Fighter" by Christina Aguilera, ending up in the Top 4 of Team Mika. In the live rounds, she sang "Everytime" from Britney Spears and was saved by public vote as top pick from Team Mika. In the second live round, she sang "Amoureuse" from Véronique Sanson again ending as public favourite from Team Mika with the biggest number of votes. Mika also opted to keep David Thibault as Top 2 in his team.

In the semi-finals held on April 18, she confronted David Thibault in a bid to represent Team Mika in the final. She sang "Pas là" from Vianney, but lost to Thibault in the public vote, with the latter qualifying to the final. Tawaji ended up finishing joint 5th to 8th place for the season.

Following her appearance on the show, Tawaji was signed to Mercury Records in 2015, and released her first single in the French language, Comme un symbole, which she performed on The Voice as a musical guest on the eleventh episode of the fifth season. Her versatile vocal abilities and experience on stage attracted the attention of the producers of Notre-Dame de Paris, Riccardo Cocciante and Luc Plamondon, who offered her to reprise Hélène Ségara's legendary role of Esmeralda in the musical for its first official revival, which opened at the Palais des Congrès in Paris in November 2016. She then proceeded on tour with the cast, performing sold out shows in Taiwan, China, Turkey, Russia, Canada, South Korea, Switzerland, the UK, the United States and Belgium, in addition to a tour of France and her home country of Lebanon, where the musical headlined the Jounieh International Festival. As of 2022, Tawaji has still been performing with the cast of the musical, most recently in New York City.

In 2015, Tawaji collaborated with Disney and sang Nuits d'Arabie from Aladdin on the French album We Love Disney compilation best of, which also featured prominent French singers Kendji Girac, Jenifer and Nolwenn Leroy amongst others.

2017–2022: Hiba Tawaji 30 and global activities

In 2017, Tawaji announced the release of her new project with Oussama Rahbani, titled Hiba Tawaji 30, honoring her 30th birthday. The album's release was preceded by Tawaji's release of the patriotic song Bghannilak Ya Watani, whose music video showcases a better vision of Lebanon in the future. It was directed by Tawaji herself. Hiba Tawaji 30 consists of 30 songs on two CDs. The first CD contains 15 original songs, most of them written by Ghadi Rahbani with five songs written by Oussama Rahbani. The second disc is a compilation of Tawaji's best previous works as well as covers of Umm Kulthum and Sayed Darwish. The last song of Tawaji's new album, additionally, was produced by Disney for the animated series Elena of Avalor, for which she dubbed the singing role of main character Princess Elena in Arabic. The album was released on 30 March 2017.

In April 2017, Tawaji was featured on the track Solidarité (Solidarity) by French-Lebanese artist Matthieu Chedid, which appears on his album Lamomali. She also attended the Cannes Film Festival as an ambassador for luxury jewellery brand Chopard.

The ten years of collaboration between Hiba Tawaji and Oussama Rahbani were celebrated by the two artists during a live show called TEN, which was exclusively performed on stage as the closing act of the Cedars International Festival in Bsharri, Lebanon, on 5 August 2017. The critically-praised production featured more than 120 dancers choreographed by Pascale Sayegh Zgheib, and was performed with the Lebanese Orchestra conducted by Oussama Rahbani.

Hiba Tawaji's renowned and respected status was solidified as she was selected, in December 2017, to be the first female artist ever to take the stage in Saudi Arabia, following women's rights reforms in Saudi Arabia undertaken by Crown Prince Mohammed bin Salman. Her historic performance was broadcast and reported by international media all around the world for breaking taboos, and was highlighted as an achievement in the battle of women in the Arab world towards freedom and equality in society. In that occasion, she re-released a special version of her song Min Elli Byekhtar (Who Chooses), accompanied by a music video celebrating the lifting of the driving ban on women in Saudi Arabia.

Following this event, Tawaji performed a special Christmas concert – which she has since made a yearly tradition – and released a special Christmas album, titled Hallelujah, again produced by Oussama Rahbani. She was, the next year, the singer of the official soundtrack of the popular series Tarik, which premiered during the month of Ramadan in 2018. The Ramadan season representing the peak of TV audiences yearly, the song, also called Tarik, was listened to by broad audiences in the Arabic-speaking world and became Tawaji's most popular song. Tarik boosted Tawaji's career as it showcased her versatility and ability to also tap into mainstream genres far from her jazzy, orchestral and lyrical influences. That year, she also performed a sold out concert at the Dubai Opera as part of a Rahbani night, and released a remake of the song Lil Sabiyi Al Malaki, the official song of the Miss Lebanon pageant, whose rights were transferred to MTV under Rima Fakih's direction.

Collaborating with Disney for the third time, Hiba Tawaji was selected to dub Naomi Scott's voice as Jasmine in the French version of the 2019 Aladdin live-action remake, providing both speaking and singing vocals. She featured on the official soundtrack of the movie, notably with the songs Ce rêve bleu (A Whole New World) and Parler (Speechless). 

In 2019 also, Tawaji was invited by international tenor Andrea Bocelli to perform together at a concert as part of the Cedars International Festival in Lebanon. The concert was broadcast live on Lebanese television.

2020 marked Hiba Tawaji's debut on TV screens as an actress, as the lead role in Arab series Hawas (Obsession) alongside Syrian star Abed Fahed. She also performed the official soundtrack of the series, Lahza Ya Rayt (If only one moment). In 2021, she released the song Aylan in memory of the three-year old clandestine migration victim Aylan Kurdi.

2022–present: Signing at Universal and international recognition

In 2022, Tawaji signed a record deal with Universal Music Arabia, a division of Republic Records and Universal Music Group. She is managed by Lebanese-Canadian executive Wassim "SAL" Slaiby, the CEO of the label, which he launched to promote Arabic music on a global scale. Slaiby also manages Doja Cat, The Weeknd and Nicki Minaj among other talents. On 7 October 2022, Tawaji released her first single under UMA, called Que Será Será (Law Nebka Sawa) featuring Puerto Rican star Luis Fonsi. The music video accompanying the song reached 3 million views on YouTube within three days of its release.

She also conducted a one-time concert open to public for free, called Night of Hope, in the first large musical event after the 2020 Beirut explosion. As part of the cultural revival efforts amidst the political and economic crisis Lebanon is facing, the Rahbani-produced performance took place at the Forum de Beyrouth and was broadcast live on MTV Lebanon. The singer performed a duet with Elissa, one of the country's most well-known artists. She also headlined a concert in Dubai as a part of the festivities for the luxury brand Louis Vuitton's 200th anniversary.

Personal life

On 19 September 2020, she married the French-Lebanese musician Ibrahim Maalouf. In 2021, she gave birth to their son, Nael.

Influences and artistic legacy

Hiba Tawaji has received much praise for her versatile vocal abilities, as she has performed in numerous genres such as opera, Arabic pop, Western pop, jazz, blues, Tarab, Latin genres and French variété, as well as religious hymns. She cites Dalida, Lara Fabian, Celine Dion, Whitney Houston, Léo Ferré, Daniel Lévi and Charles Aznavour as her influences since childhood, alongside her personal favorite Mariah Carey, but stated she has never limited her music preferences to one genre. In her concerts, she has also tapped into the jazz genre, performing I Can Explain by Rachelle Ferrell and using the whistle register.

Tawaji is also known to shoot spontaneous behind-the-scenes documentaries of her projects and concerts, directed by Nader Mousally and released on YouTube.

Discography

Albums
 2009: Sayf 840, produced by Oussama Rahbani
 2012: La Bidayi Wala Nihayi, produced by Oussama Rahbani 
 2011: Don Quixote, produced by Oussama Rahbani 
 2014: Ya Habibi, produced by Oussama Rahbani 
 2016: Notre Dame de Paris (official soundtrack album)
 2017: Hiba Tawaji 30, double album, produced by Oussama Rahbani 
 2017: Hallelujah, Christmas album produced by Oussama Rahbani
 2019: Aladdin (official soundtrack album)

Filmography

As a director
 2013: Al Habla (The Rope), starring Nazih Youssef (short movie)

As an actress
 2020: Hawas (Obsession), starring Hiba Tawaji and Abed Fahed, directed by Mohamad Lotfy (TV series)

As a voice actress
 2017: Elena of Avalor, the Arabic version of the Disney animated series, singing
 2019: Aladdin, the French version of the Disney live-action movie, speaking and singing
 2021: Les mystères de la chorale, French TV movie produced by France 3, singing

Musical theater
 2008–2000: The Return of the Phoenix by Oussama Rahbani, performed as part of the Byblos International Festival and in Dubai, then in residency at the Casino du Liban
 2009–2010: Sayf 840 by Mansour Rahbani and Oussama Rahbani, performed as part of the Byblos International Festival, then in residency at the Casino du Liban
 2010–2019: Moulouk Al Tawaef by Oussama Rahbani, occasionally performed as part of multiple festivals in the Arab world (Qatar, Tunisia, Lebanon)
 2011: Don Quixote by Marwan Rahbani, Ghadi Rahbani and Oussama Rahbani, performed as part of the Byblos International Festival
 2016–2022: Notre-Dame de Paris by Ricardo Cocciante and Luc Plamondon, worldwide tour

References

External links
 

1987 births
21st-century Lebanese women singers
Living people
Saint Joseph University alumni
Musicians from Beirut
Greek Orthodox Christians from Lebanon
English-language singers from Lebanon
The Voice (franchise) contestants
Performers of Christian music in Arabic